The women's football tournament at the 2018 Asian Games was held from 16 to 31 August in Palembang, Indonesia. North Korea were the defending champions, but were eliminated in the quarter-finals. The host team was eliminated in the group stage.

Competition schedule

Venues
The tournament will be held in two venues in Palembang, the Gelora Sriwijaya Stadium and the Bumi Sriwijaya Stadium.

Squads

Draw
The draw for the tournament was held on 5 July 2018. The teams were seeded into four pots based on their performances in the previous Asian Games in 2014. The hosts Indonesia were automatically assigned into position A1.

Group stage
The top two teams in each group, and the two third-placed teams among three groups advance to the quarter-finals.

All times are local, WIB (UTC+7).

Tiebreakers
Teams in a group are ranked according to points (3 points for a win, 1 point for a draw, 0 points for a loss), and if tied on points, the following tiebreaking criteria are applied, in the order given, to determine the rankings.
Highest number of points obtained in all group matches;
Highest number of points obtained in the group matches between the teams concerned;
Goal difference resulting from the group matches between the teams concerned;
Highest number of goals scored from all group matches between the teams concerned;
If two or more teams have equal ranking with the criteria so far, reapply the criteria above only for them. If this re-application gives no more ranking, apply the following criteria.
Goal difference in all group matches;
Highest number of goals scored in all group matches;
Kicks from the penalty mark only if two (2) teams are involved and they are both on the field of play.
Fewer points of yellow/red cards in all group matches (only one of these deductions shall be applied to a player in a single match): 
Drawing of lots

Third-placed teams from the three groups are ranked according to the following criteria, after the results against the fourth-placed teams of groups A and B are excluded in order to rank them with the same numbers of matches.
Highest number of points obtained in all group matches;
Goal difference in all group matches;
Highest number of goals scored in all group matches;
Fewer points of yellow/red cards in all group matches (only one of these deductions shall be applied to a player in a single match): 
Drawing of lots

Group A

Group B

Group C

Ranking of third-placed teams
In order to ensure equality when comparing the third-placed teams of all groups, the results of the matches against the 4th-placed teams in Group A and Group B were ignored due to Group C having only three teams.

Knockout stage
In the knockout stage, extra time and penalty shoot-out are used to decide the winner if necessary, except for the third place match where penalty shoot-out (no extra time) is used to decide the winner if necessary.

Bracket

Quarter-finals

Semi-finals

Bronze medal match

Gold medal match

Statistics

Goalscorers

Final standing

See also
Football at the 2018 Asian Games – Men's tournament

References

External links
Football at the 2018 Asian Games

Women